The 1999 Abia State gubernatorial election occurred in Nigeria on January 9, 1999. The PDP nominee Orji Uzor Kalu won the election, defeating the APP candidate.

Orji Uzor Kalu won the PDP nomination at the primary election. His running mate was Eyinnaya Abaribe.

Electoral system
The Governor of Abia State is elected using the plurality voting system.

Results
PDP's Orji Uzor Kalu emerged winner in the contest.

The total number of registered voters in the state for the election was 1,321,895. However, only 1,321,400 were previously issued voting cards in the state.

References 

Abia State gubernatorial elections
Abia State gubernatorial election
Plateau State gubernatorial election